Blåberget  is a mountain in Dovre Municipality in Innlandet county, Norway. The mountain is surrounded by several other notable mountains including Gråhøe to the southeast, Falketind and Halvfarhøe to the south, and Storhøe and Fokstuguhøi to the southwest.

See also
List of mountains of Norway

References

Dovre
Mountains of Innlandet